Locmaria is a commune in the Morbihan department in Brittany in north-western France. Locmaria is one of the four communes of Belle Île.

Toponymy
From the Breton loc which means hermitage (cf.: Locminé) and 'maria' which derive from Mary.

Demographics
Inhabitants of Locmaria are called in French Locmariaïstes.

Geography

The village occupies the eastern part of the island Belle-Île-en-Mer. Rocky cliffs, sometimes 50 meters high, surround the territory. On the north coast, stretches the beach Les Grands Sables.

Map

See also
Communes of the Morbihan department

References

External links

Official site 

 Mayors of Morbihan Association 

Communes of Morbihan
Populated coastal places in Brittany